The Europe Zone was one of the three regional zones of the 1973 Davis Cup.

31 teams entered the Europe Zone, competing across 2 sub-zones. 14 teams competed in the preliminary rounds, with the winners progressing to the main draw and joining the remaining 17 teams. The winners of each sub-zone went on to compete in the Inter-Zonal Zone against the winners of the Americas Zone and Eastern Zone.

Romania defeated the Soviet Union in the Zone A final, and Czechoslovakia defeated Italy in the Zone B final, resulting in both Romania and Czechoslovakia progressing to the Inter-Zonal Zone.

Zone A

Preliminary round

Draw

Results
Austria vs. Monaco

Ireland vs. Norway

Greece vs. Finland

Main Draw

Draw

First round
Israel vs. Netherlands

Austria vs. New Zealand

Norway vs. Denmark

Greece vs. Hungary

Quarterfinals
Netherlands vs. Romania

Yugoslavia vs. New Zealand

Norway vs. France

Hungary vs. Soviet Union

Semifinals
Romania vs. New Zealand

Soviet Union vs. France

Final
Romania vs. Soviet Union

Zone B

Preliminary round

Draw

Results
Egypt vs. Turkey

Portugal vs. Switzerland

Bulgaria vs. Iran

Morocco vs. Luxembourg

Main Draw

Draw

First round
Egypt vs. Poland

Switzerland vs. West Germany

Bulgaria vs. Belgium

Morocco vs. Sweden

Quarterfinals
Egypt vs. Czechoslovakia

West Germany vs. Great Britain

Italy vs. Bulgaria

Sweden vs. Spain

Semifinals
Czechoslovakia vs. West Germany

Italy vs. Spain

Final
Czechoslovakia vs. Italy

References

External links
Davis Cup official website

Davis Cup Europe/Africa Zone
Europe Zone
Davis Cup
Davis Cup
Davis Cup
Davis Cup